Shakedown may refer to:
 Shakedown (continuum mechanics), a type of plastic deformation
 Shakedown (testing) or a shakedown cruise, a period of testing undergone by a ship, airplane or other craft before being declared operational
 Extortion, a criminal act of coercion or intimidation for personal gain
 A colloquial term for an inspection for contraband inside a prison
 An English term for kuzushi techniques of various Japanese martial arts, which literally means shaking down the opponent

Music
 Shakedown (band), a Swiss musical project formed in 1999
 Shakedown Records, a record label founded by Red Café

Albums
 Shakedown (album), by the Freemasons, 2007
 Shake Down (album), by Savoy Brown, 1967
 Shakedown! The Texas Tapes Revisited, by Bobby Fuller, 1996
 Shakedown!, by theStart, 2001

Songs
 "Shakedown" (Bob Seger song), 1987
 "Shake Down", by Akon from Konvicted, 2006
 "Shakedown", by Behind Crimson Eyes from A Revelation for Despair, 2006
 "Shake Down", by Billy Squier from the St. Elmo's Fire film soundtrack, 1985
 "Shakedown", by Blondie from The Curse of Blondie
 "Shake Down", by Die Warzau from Disco Rigido, 1989
 "Shake Down", by Mary J. Blige from Growing Pains, 2007

Film
 The Shakedown (1929 film) directed by William Wyler
 Shakedown (1936 film) directed by David Selman
 Shakedown (1950 film) directed by Joseph Pevney
 The Shakedown (1959 film) directed by John Lemont
 Shakedown (1988 film), crime action movie starring Peter Weller and Sam Elliott
 Shakedown: Return of the Sontarans, 1995 made-for-video dramatic spin-off of Doctor Who
 Shakedown (2018 film) a 2018 documentary about a black lesbian strip club directed by Leilah Weinraub

Books
 Shakedown (Angel novel), a 2000 original novel based on the U.S. television series Angel
 Shakedown, the novelisation of Shakedown: Return of the Sontarans by Terrance Dicks
 Shakedown: Exposing the Real Jesse Jackson by Kenneth R. Timmerman
 Shakedown: How Our Government is Undermining Democracy in the Name of Human Rights by Ezra Levant

Other
 Shakedown (Snowboard Games), rider-driven snowboard event 
 Shakedown, a fictional supervillain in the DC Universe who is a member of Masters of Disaster